Ivan Diaconu is a ten-time national champion from Moldova who competed at the 2000 Summer Olympics in Sydney.

References

External links
 

Wrestlers at the 2000 Summer Olympics
Moldovan male sport wrestlers
Olympic wrestlers of Moldova
Living people
Year of birth missing (living people)
Place of birth missing (living people)